Egypt participated at the 2015 All-Africa Games held in the city of Brazzaville, Republic of the Congo. It participated with 298 athletes in 17 sports.

Medal summary

Medal table

Paralympic Sports

Multiple medallists

Athletics

Badminton

Basketball

Boxing

Cycling

Fencing

Gymnastics

Handball

Egypt won the handball final for men against Angola

Judo

Karate

Swimming

Table tennis

Taekwondo

Tennis

Volleyball

Men

Women

Weightlifting

Wrestling

References

Nations at the 2015 African Games
2015
All-Africa Games